The Men's 50 kilometre classical competition at the FIS Nordic World Ski Championships 2021 was held on 7 March 2021.

Results
The race was started at 13:00.

References

Men's 50 kilometre classical